The first season of the drama television series created by Hubert Barrero Enemigo íntimo premiered on Telemundo on 21 February 2018, at 10.00 pm in the U.S., and concluded on 7 May 2018. It consists of fifty-three episodes, each of approximately 45 minutes.

Enemigo íntimo features a large ensemble cast, including Raúl Méndez, Fernanda Castillo, Matías Novoa, Rafael Sánchez Navarro, Guillermo Quintanilla, Leonardo Daniel, and Otto Sirgo in the starring roles.

Cast

Main 

 Raúl Méndez as Alejandro Ferrer
 Fernanda Castillo as Roxana Rodiles
 Matías Novoa as Daniel Laborde / Eduardo Tapia "El Tilapia"
 Rafael Sánchez Navarro as Leopoldo Borges
 Guillermo Quintanilla as Anselmo López "Guillotina"
 Leonardo Daniel as Commander David Gómez
 Otto Sirgo as Nemesio Rendón
 Alejandro Speitzer as Luis Rendón "El Berebere"
 Armando Hernández as Héctor Fernández "Colmillo"
 Samadhi Zendejas as María Antonia Reyes "Mamba"
 Valentina Acosta as Olivia Reyes
 Itahisa Machado as Marimar Rubio
 Elvira Monsell as Zoraida
 Mayra Rojas as Clarisa
 Alpha Acosta as Minerva Zambrano
 Mar Zamora as Ochún
 María del Carmen Félix as Ana Mercedes Calicio "La Puma"
 Mauricio Rousselon as Robaldo Bolado "El Bowser"
 Natalia Benvenuto as Puki
 Alan Ciangherotti as Bernardo Rendón "El Buitre"
 Tania Niebla as Tamara
 Miguel René Moreno as Lieutenant Gabriel Puenzo
 René García as Priamo Cabrales
 Francisco Calvillo as Rafael Mantilla Moreno "El Patojo"
 Diego Soldano as Federico Montalvo
 Flavio Peniche as Pedro Bencomo Saldivia "Sanson"
 Sandra Benhumea as Lula Pineda
 Rafael Nieves as Lieutenant Carlos Muñán
 Mónica Jiménez as Eladia Cornejo
 Iván Aragón as Juan Romero "El Chamaco"
 Jean Paul Leroux as Ángel Cordero
 Roberto Uscanga as Fermín Pedraza "El Cristero"
 Eduardo Reza as Gibrán Mendiola

Episodes

References

External links 
 

2018 American television seasons
2018 Mexican television seasons